Suncheon Do clan is one of the Korean clans. Their Bon-gwan is in Suncheon, South Jeolla Province. According to the research held in 2015, the number of Suncheon Do clan's member was 829. Do clan was a clan came from Taotang in China. Their founder was  who worked as a Jinshi in Yuan dynasty and entered Goryeo as a fatherly master of Princess Jeguk who had a marriage to an ordinary person planned by Chungnyeol of Goryeo in Goryeo. Then,  was settled in Suncheon and founded Suncheon Do clan.

See also 
 Foreign clans in Korean

References 

 
Korean clan names of Chinese origin
Do clans